Tridrepana albonotata is a moth of the family Drepanidae described by Frederic Moore in 1879. It is found in India, Nepal, Vietnam, Sri Lanka, Peninsular Malaysia, Sumatra, Borneo, Java, Bali and Sulawesi.

Description
In the female, the body is chestnut brown with a purplish tinge. Forewings with indistinct maculate antemedial and postmedial fuscous bands. Two white dark-outlines specks present at end of cell. Traces of a submarginal series of dark specks. A dark blotch on outer margin below the apex. Hindwings with the markings similar. One white speck found at end of cell.

Subspecies
Tridrepana albonotata albonotata (India, Nepal, Vietnam)
Tridrepana albonotata ferrea (Hampson, 1892) (Sri Lanka)
Tridrepana albonotata angusta Watson, 1957 (Peninsular Malaysia, Sumatra, Borneo)
Tridrepana albonotata rotunda Watson, 1957 (Java, Bali)
Tridrepana albonotata celebesensis Watson, 1957 (Sulawesi)

References

External links
The Moths of Borneo

Drepaninae
Moths described in 1879